The Scottish Women's Hospitals for Foreign Services (SWH) was founded in 1914. It was led by Dr. Elsie Inglis and provided nurses, doctors, ambulance drivers, cooks and orderlies. By the end of World War I, 14 medical units had been outfitted and sent to serve in Corsica, France, Malta, Romania, Russia, Salonika and Serbia.

Beginnings 
At the outset of the war, Dr Elsie Inglis was secretary for the Scottish Federation of Women Suffrage Societies, affiliated with the National Union of Women's Suffrage Societies (NUWSS) headed by Millicent Garrett Fawcett. The SWH was spearheaded by Dr Inglis, as part of a wider suffrage effort from the Scottish Federation of the National Union of Women's Suffrage Societies and funded by private donations, fundraising of local societies, the National Union of Women's Suffrage Societies and the American Red Cross.

Fawcett wished to include "Women's Suffrage" in the name, but Inglis opposed this on the grounds that "suffrage" had controversial political connotations based on the example of those who advocated civil disobedience such as Emmeline Pankhurst. While not all volunteers supported the suffrage movement, the letters "NUWSS" appeared on SWH letterhead and many of their vehicles, and the French press often referred to their facilities as "Hospital of the Scottish Suffragists", and the NUWSS provided financial support.

Initial fundraising was highly successful after Fawcett invited Inglis to speak in London, and by the end of August 1914 they had raised more than £5,000. Established shortly after the outbreak of World War I as voluntary all-women units, the Scottish Women's Hospitals offered opportunities for medical women who were prohibited from entry into the Royal Army Medical Corps.

The headquarters were in Edinburgh throughout the war, and there were also committees in Glasgow and London, working closely with the London office of the Croix Rouge Francaise (French Red Cross).

Dr. Alice Hutchison was the first doctor of SWH sent to France to establish the first hospital. She initially placed it in Boulogne. While searching for a building for a hospital, a typhoid epidemic broke out amongst Belgian refugees in Calais. She, along with another doctor and ten nurses, treated the patients. She was noted for having the lowest rate of deaths of typhoid in her hospital.

In December 1914, a hospital was established with 200-beds at Royaumont Abbey, known as Scottish Women's Hospital at Royaumont, officially called Hôpital Auxiliaire 301. The initial staff included Inglis, Alice Hutchison, Ishobel Ross, Cicely Hamilton, Marian & Hope Gamwell and their mother, and Katherine Harley. The Scottish Women's Hospitals serviced 14 medical units across mainland France and Corsica, Malta, Romania, Russia, Salonika and Serbia. In April 1915, Dr Inglis was head of a unit based in Serbia. Within seven months of mobilising, the SWH were servicing 1,000 beds with 250 staff which included 19 female doctors.

France 
The first Scottish Women's Hospital was, in November 1914, staffed, equipped and established at Calais to support the Belgian Army. Vicomtess de la Panouse, wife of the French military attaché to the French embassy in London helped the group identify another location at the ancient Royaumont Abbey. By December a second hospital was based there. It remained operational throughout the war and treated wounded from the French Army under the direction of the French Red Cross. A further hospital was opened at Troyes (Château de Chanteloup, Sainte-Savine) and Villers-Cotterets along with the popular and supportive canteens at Creil, Soissons and Crepy-en-Valois.

Serbia 

Also in December, a hospital led by Dr Eleanor Soltau was dispatched to Serbia. Other units quickly followed and Serbia soon had four primary hospitals working night and day. The conditions in Serbia were dire. The Serbian army had a mere 300 doctors to serve more than half a million men, and as well as battle casualties the hospital had to deal with a typhus epidemic which ravaged the military and civilian populations. Serbia had fought a surprisingly successful military campaign against the invading Austrians but the fight had exhausted the nation. Both soldiers and civilians were half starved and worn out and in those conditions diseases thrived and hundreds of thousands perished.

From December 1914 to November 1915., the hospital was based in Kragujevac. The Imperial War Museum's "Lives of the First World War" has a list of all those who worked in that location.

Four SWH staff, Louisa Jordan, Madge Fraser, Augusta Minshull and Bessie Sutherland died during the epidemic, the first two are buried in Niš Commonwealth Military Cemetery. By the winter of 1915 Serbia could hold out no more. The Austrians had been joined by German and Bulgarian forces who again invaded, and the Serbs were forced to retreat into Albania.

The SWH staff had a choice to make, stay and go into captivity (or worse) or go with the retreating army into Albania. In the end some stayed and some went. Elsie Inglis, Evelina Haverfield, Alice Hutchison, Helen MacDougall and others were taken prisoner and were eventually repatriated to Britain. The others joined the Serbian army and government in its retreat and suffered the indescribable horrors of that retreat and shared the hardships endured by the Serbian army.

The March 
The army retreated over the mountains of Albania and Montenegro in the depths of winter with no food, shelter or help, and thousands upon thousands of soldiers, civilians, and prisoners of war died during the retreat. One SWH nurse, Caroline Toughill, had her skull fractured when the car in which she was travelling fell off a cliff near the town of Rača. Despite treatment by a Serbian major and another passenger from the car, (nurse Margaret Cowie Crowe) in a Red Cross camp to which she was taken, she died. Those who made it to the safety of the Adriatic Sea continued to give what help they could to soldiers, civilians and in particular to the many boys who had joined the retreat. As a direct consequence of this the SWH set up a convalescent hospital in Corsica in December 1915 to help displaced Serb women and children.

Salonika 

During this period the hospital at Troyes in France was ordered to pack. Designed as a mobile rather than a fixed hospital it was equipped with tents and vehicles. It was attached to a division of the French army and was dispatched to Salonika in Greece when their French division was transferred there as part of a belated move by the allies to provide practical help to the beleaguered Serbs. The hospital (known as the Girton & Newnham Unit after the Cambridge University women's colleges which funded it) was set up in a disused silkworm factory in the border town of Gevgelia, though it soon had to be relocated to the city of Salonika when the rapid Bulgarian advance threatened. Much of the work at Salonika was spent fighting malaria, a huge killer made worse by the lack of suitable clothing supplied by the allied armies.

It was joined in August 1916 there by the Ostrovo Unit or the American Unit. This hospital was funded chiefly by American donors and was so named in gratitude to them. The unit was moved in early September 90 miles north–west of Salonika to Lake Ostrovo (now Lake Vegoritida in Greece), and supported the Serbian Army's push back into its homeland. Also sent to Ostrovo was a Transport Column. This was a motor ambulance unit which allowed SWH to collect casualties quickly rather than wait for casualties to be brought to them, including volunteer women motor ambulance drivers, like Elsie Cameron Corbett.

Russia 
Following her repatriation to the UK in February 1916, Dr Inglis set about equipping and staffing a hospital to serve in Russia. Other veterans of the first Serbian hospital, including Dr Lilian Chesney and Evelina Haverfield, joined her. A hospital and attendant transport column of ambulances and support vehicles was sent to Russia. It served in southern Russia (Bessarabia and Moldova) and in Romania, providing medical care chiefly to the Serbian Division of the Russian army. This division was primarily made up of volunteers from the Serbian diaspora along with ethnic Serbian and south Slavic prisoners of war from the Austro-Hungarian army, who after their capture by Russia sought the opportunity to fight for their people. The Serb division had no medical facilities so these were provided by SWH to some 11,000 men with only seven doctors. Led by Elsie Inglis who had a strong affinity to the Serbian army and people and was recognised in their highest award (The Serbian Order of the White Eagle) for her service, the SWH staff once again endured the hardship of the war when they had to take part in a chaotic and painful retreat after the Romanian army was routed in 1917. Russia was then plunged into revolution and, when it became clear that the Russian army was unlikely to resume operations, the hospital was withdrawn. A division of Serb soldiers and officers, along with Inglis, sailed from Archangel through submarine infested waters to the UK. Tragically, the day after they arrived back in Britain, Elsie Inglis, who had been very sick with bowel cancer for some time, died. Soon after the Elsie Inglis Unit was established in her memory and sent out to join the Girton & Newnham and the American units both providing medical support to the Serb army in Macedonia. Together they provided much needed help during the campaigns of 1918 which saw the Serbs and their British, French, Russian, Greek and Italian allies drive the Germans, Austro-Hungarians and Bulgarians out of Macedonia and Serbia.

Closing years 
Towards the end of the war SWH in Serbia itself provided medical help to soldiers, civilians and prisoners of war (as well as continuing to provide care to refugees in Corsica and at the TB hospital in Sallanches in France). A new fixed hospital was established in Vranje for 300 patients, but by early 1919 this had been handed over to the Serbian authorities - more or less bringing to an end the SWH. While most SWH members went home and resumed their pre war lives, many SWH staff and ‘veterans’ chose to stay on to provide much needed medical care in Serbia. Dr Katherine Stewart MacPhail opened a hospital for sick children in Belgrade (and continued this work until forced out by Tito's government in 1947); Evelina Haverfield ran a hospital for orphans until her tragic death in March 1920; and some others did what they could to help, often using their own money, to single-handedly help destitute soldiers, refugees or the many orphans and widows who were all in desperate need of assistance. Others did relief work elsewhere. Isabel Emslie Hutton, for example, went to work with refugees from the Russian Civil War in Crimea.

Impact 
Over 1,000 women from many different backgrounds and many different countries served with the SWH. Only the medical professionals such as doctors, nurses, laboratory technicians and x-ray operators received a salary and expenses; while non-medical staff such as orderlies, administrators, drivers, cooks and others received no pay at all (and were in fact expected to pay their way).

In keeping with the aims of the SWH it was a deliberate policy that, as far as possible, all members of SWH units should be women, so allowing opportunities for unqualified women who could nonetheless get the chance to both serve the war effort in some capacity and the cause of women's rights. Some women joined because it was one of the few opportunities open to women to help the war effort; others saw it as a rare chance for adventure in a world that up till then offered women very few chances; and all shared, with varying degrees, the desire to improve the lot of women. Over £500,000 was raised by every manner possible to fund the organisation and during the war years it is estimated that hundreds of thousands of patients' lives were save; all nursed and helped by the SWH.

Notable women volunteers 

Wilhelmina Hay Abbott, fundraiser for the Scottish Women's Hospitals
Louisa Aldrich-Blake - British surgeon (later worked in obstetrics and gynaecology), 
Millicent Sylvia Armstrong, Australian orderly
Mary Josephine Bedford, Australian ambulance driver
Jean Aitken Bell, Scottish nurse
Elizabeth Bertram, Scottish nurse
Agnes Bennett, Australian doctor
Mary Alice Blair, New Zealand doctor and Head of Unit
Elsie Bowerman, British ambulance driver
Vera Christina Chute Collum, British X-ray assistant
The Honourable Elsie Cameron Corbett, British ambulance driver
Lilian Violet Cooper, Australian doctor
Elizabeth Courtauld, British doctor
C Muriel Craigie, British headquarters administrator
Elsie Jean Dalyell, Australian doctor
Georgina Davidson, Scottish doctor
Margaret Charlotte Davidson - Scottish orderly then nurse
Mabel Dearmer, British orderly
Mary De Garis, Australian doctor
Violet Douglas-Pennant, British philanthropist 
Miles Franklin, Australian cook
Margaret Neill Fraser, Scottish nurse
Norah Neilson Gray, British nurse
Edith Hacon, Scottish housekeeper
Kathleen Burke Hale, British fundraiser decorated by 7 countries
Helen Hanson, British physician, missionary, suffragist
Mabel Hardie, British surgeon
Katherine Harley, British nurse
Evelina Haverfield, British nurse
Maud Doria Haviland, British chauffeur, ornithologist and anthropologist
Mary H. J. Henderson, Scottish unit administrator and war poet
Lydia Manley Henry, Scottish surgeon
Ruth Holden, American paleobotanist, nurse
Vera "Jack" Holme, British ambulance driver
Laura Margaret Hope, Australian doctor
Alice Hutchison, British doctor
Isabel Emslie Hutton, British doctor
Elsie Inglis, British doctor and founder of the Scottish Women's Hospitals
Kathleen Innes, British Quaker, educator, writer, pacifist - orderly and administrator
Frances Ivens, British chief medical officer
Louisa Jordan, Scottish nurse
Honoria Somerville Keer, British surgeon
Olive Kelso King, Australian ambulance driver
Sybil Lewis, British doctor, from Hull but trained in Edinburgh
Rotha Lintorn-Orman, British ambulance driver
Hilda Lorimer, British classical scholar - orderly
Edith McKay, Australian nurse
Mary Lauchline McNeill, Scottish doctor and suffragist
Alexandrina Matilda MacPhail, Scottish doctor
Katherine Stewart MacPhail, Scottish doctor
Louise McIlroy, Irish-born British physician
Louisa Martindale, British physician and surgeon
Caroline Matthews, British doctor
Ethel Moir, Scottish nursing orderly
Harriet Christina Newcomb, British-Australian committee member
Ruth Nicholson, British Assistant surgeon
Grace Pailthorpe, British surrealist painter, surgeon, psychology researcher
Hilda Petrie, British archaeologist, honorary secretary for the Scottish Women's Hospitals
Mary Elizabeth Phillips, Welsh doctor
Alma Rattenbury, British orderly and murder accused 
Elizabeth Ness Mcbean Ross, British doctor
Laura Sandeman, Scottish doctor
Jessie Ann Scott, New Zealand doctor
Olive Smith, British masseuse
Eleanor Soltau, Unit leader to Serbia and British doctor
Mabel St Clair Stobart, British Unit Head and Major
Edith Stoney, Irish radiographer
Leslie Joy Whitehead, Canadian soldier

Archives
Elsie Inglis' archives are held at the Mitchell Library in Glasgow. A large cardboard box, ref TD1734/20/4, containing many individual accounts of the flight from Serbia,  can also be found there

Scottish Women's Hospital Archives are also held at The Women's Library at the Library of the London School of Economics, ref 2SWH The Women's Library also holds a Scrapbook on Scottish Women's Hospital from the time, ref 10/22. Papers of individuals who were part of SWH now held at The Women's Library include the Papers of Elsie Bowerman ref 7ELB the Papers of Vera "Jack" Holme ref 7VJH, as well as individual books, postcards and photographs related to the Scottish Women's Hospital and of several of the women who served.

The Women's Work Collection at the Imperial War Museum holds many photographs of the SWH.

Additional SWH members' materials are held in various archive offices: memoirs of Katherine North née Hodges are in the Leeds Russian Archive; the journals of Mary Lee Milne are held by the National Library of Scotland, papers of Lilas Grant and Ethel Moir are in the Central Library, Edinburgh; the Lothian Health Archives hold the letters of Yvonne Fitzroy and more than sixty other documents relating to the hospital; a Photograph album relating to the Scottish Women's Hospital in Salonika, 1907–1918 (ref RCPSG 74) is held at the Royal College of Physicians and Surgeons of Glasgow, whilst the Schlesinger Library, Harvard University holds the papers of Ruth Holden. The Public Record Office of Northern Ireland also holds papers of the Scottish Women's Hospitals in Serbia papers ref D1982. The National Library of Scotland holds film footage of a Scottish Women's Hospitals unit in action. And Scottish Screen has a documentary silent film, 'one of the earliest documentaries' of the front line medical and nursing activities, taken at the WSH units in Villers-Cotterês and in Salonika.

References

Citations

Bibliography
 Scottish Women's Hospitals
 Women in Uniform, The National Archives
 Scottish Women's Hospital Unit
 Dr Elsie Inglis and the Scottish Women's Hospital
 Isabel Galloway Emslie Hutton (1928) With a woman's unit in Serbia, Salonika and Sebastopol Williams and Norgate, London
 McLaren, Eva Shaw (1919) A History of the Scottish Women's Hospitals Hodder and Stoughton, London (Google Books, archive.org)

Further reading 
 
  — available online via the Internet Archive

External links 

 List of S.W.H. people
 WW1 – Scottish Women's Hospital - especially  in slides 22-25
 Serbia Remembers the Scottish Women's Hospitals
Extensive biographical information and photographs of many of the women  (in alphabetical order) was compiled for a now defunct website but can still be viewed on the Internet Archive https://web.archive.org/web/20160315151127/http://scottishwomenshospitals.co.uk/women/
A timeline of the Scottish Women's Hospital can be found at https://time.graphics/line/19360
The website "Lives of the First World War" has compiled a list of women from the Scottish Women's Hospital who lost their lives during the war. It  includes some photographs and biographical information.
Films:
Scottish Women's Hospitals - a field hospital on the front line during the First World War
The Women Who Went to War – A Great Adventure
Radio
 https://radioadelaide.org.au/2019/12/02/debbie-robson-the-swh-and-the-aussie-women-who-served-in-it/ - interview about Australian women and the SWH

 
1914 establishments in Scotland
1919 disestablishments in Scotland
Military medical organizations
British women in World War I
Campaigns and theatres of World War I
Modern history of Greek Macedonia
Greece in World War I
Serbia in World War I
Vardar Macedonia (1912–1918)
Wars involving the Balkans
Organisations based in Edinburgh
Defunct organisations based in Scotland
United Kingdom in World War I
Women's suffrage in Scotland